Sabah Tanah Airku (Jawi: سابه تانه ايركو, ; "Sabah, My Homeland") is the official state anthem of Sabah, Malaysia that was written by HB Hermann, a Singaporean resident who submitted it to a competition made for selecting the state anthem. It won the competition on 16 May 1963 and was aired for the first time on July 18 of that year. It became the state anthem upon Sabah's accession to the Federation of Malaysia on 16 September that same year.

Lyrics

References

Notes

External links
 Sabah.org.my - State Flag, Crest, and Anthem

Sabah
Anthems of Malaysia
Year of song missing